USS Nahant may refer to the following ships of the United States Navy:

 , an ironclad monitor launched in 1862 that saw service in the American Civil War and the Spanish–American War
 , a tugboat acquired by the U.S. Navy in 1917 and decommissioned in 1928
 , a net laying ship commissioned in 1945 and sold to Uruguay in 1968

United States Navy ship names